Riedl or Riedle is a surname of German origin, derived from the Middle Low German rīden, meaning ‘to ride’. People with the surname Riedl include:

 Alessandro Riedle (born 1991), German footballer
 Alfred Riedl (1949–2020), Austrian football manager
 André Riedl (born 1940), Canadian politician
 Emma Riedl, interwar-era German newspaper editor
 Frigyes Riedl (1856–1921), Hungarian essayist and historian
 Harald Udo von Riedl (born 1936), Austrian botanist and mycologist
 Johannes Riedl (1950–2010), German footballer
 John T. Riedl (1962–2013), American computer scientist
 Josef Anton Riedl (1929–2016), German composer 
 Karl-Heinz Riedle (born 1965), German footballer
 Rupert Riedl (1925–2005), Austrian zoologist
 Thomas Riedl (born 1976), German footballer

See also
Riedel, a similar German surname

References

Surnames from given names